Hymenogaster subalpinus is a species of mushroom-forming fungus in the family Hymenogastraceae.

Refererence

Hymenogastraceae
Fungi described in 1966
Taxa named by Alexander H. Smith